Jeris Jerome White (born September 3, 1952) is a former professional American football cornerback in the National Football League (NFL) for nine seasons for the Miami Dolphins, Tampa Bay Buccaneers, and Washington Redskins. He played football at Radford High School, Honolulu, Hawaii, and at the University of Hawaii. He was drafted by Miami in the second round of the 1974 NFL Draft. He is the first person from a Hawaii high and collegiate school to ever play in a Super Bowl. White was a holdout when the Redskins opened the 1983 season, so Washington replaced him with its first-round draft pick Darrell Green.

References

1952 births
Living people
American football cornerbacks
Hawaii Rainbow Warriors football players
Miami Dolphins players
Players of American football from Honolulu
Tampa Bay Buccaneers players
Washington Redskins players
Admiral Arthur W. Radford High School alumni